The 2019 AFC Cup was the 16th edition of the AFC Cup, Asia's secondary club football tournament organized by the Asian Football Confederation (AFC).

Al-Ahed won the title for the first time, defeating April 25 in the final. Al-Quwa Al-Jawiya were the title holders, having won the previous three editions of the tournament. However, they were unable to defend the title as Iraqi teams played in the AFC Champions League instead of the AFC Cup in the 2019 edition.

Association team allocation
The 46 AFC member associations (excluding the associate member Northern Mariana Islands) are ranked based on their national team's and clubs' performance over the last four years in AFC competitions, with the allocation of slots for the 2019 and 2020 editions of the AFC club competitions determined by the 2017 AFC rankings (Entry Manual Article 2.3):
The associations are split into five zones:
West Asia Zone consists of the associations from the West Asian Football Federation (WAFF).
Central Asia Zone consists of the associations from Central Asian Football Association (CAFA).
South Asia Zone consists of the associations from the South Asian Football Federation (SAFF).
ASEAN Zone consists of the associations from the ASEAN Football Federation (AFF).
East Asia Zone consists of the associations from the East Asian Football Federation (EAFF).
All associations which do not receive direct slots in the AFC Champions League group stage are eligible to enter the AFC Cup.
In each zone, the number of groups in the group stage is determined based on the number of entries, with the number of slots filled through play-offs same as the number of groups:
In the West Asia Zone and the ASEAN Zone, there are three groups in the group stage, including a total of 9 direct slots, with the 3 remaining slots filled through play-offs.
In the Central Asia Zone, the South Asia Zone, and the East Asia Zone, there is one group in the group stage, including a total of 3 direct slots, with the 1 remaining slot filled through play-offs.
The top associations participating in the AFC Cup in each zone as per the AFC rankings get at least one direct slot in the group stage (including losers of the AFC Champions League qualifying play-offs), while the remaining associations get only play-off slots:
For the West Asia Zone and the ASEAN zone:
The associations ranked 1st to 3rd each get two direct slots.
The associations ranked 4th to 6th each get one direct slot and one play-off slot.
The associations ranked 7th or below each get one play-off slot.
For the Central Asia Zone, the South Asia Zone, and the East Asia zone:
The associations ranked 1st to 3rd each get one direct slot and one play-off slot.
The associations ranked 4th or below each get one play-off slot.
The maximum number of slots for each association is one-third of the total number of eligible teams in the top division.
If any association gives up its direct slots, they are redistributed to the highest eligible association, with each association limited to a maximum of two direct slots.
If any association gives up its play-off slots, they are annulled and not redistributed to any other association.
If the number of teams in the play-offs in any zone is fewer than twice the number of group stage slots filled through play-offs, the play-off teams of the highest eligible associations are given byes to the group stage.

Association ranking
For the 2019 AFC Cup, the associations are allocated slots according to their association ranking which was published on 15 December 2017, which takes into account their performance in the AFC Champions League and the AFC Cup, as well as their national team's FIFA World Rankings, between 2014 and 2017.

Notes

Teams
The following 43 teams from 26 associations entered the competition.

Notes

Schedule
The schedule of the competition is as follows (W: West Asia Zone; C: Central Asia Zone; S: South Asia Zone; A: ASEAN Zone; E: East Asia Zone).

Qualifying play-offs

Preliminary round

Play-off round

Group stage

Group A

Group B

Group C

Group D

Group E

Group F

Group G

Group H

Group I

Ranking of second-placed teams

West Asia Zone

ASEAN Zone

Knockout stage

Bracket

Zonal semi-finals

Zonal finals

Inter-zone play-off semi-finals

Inter-zone play-off final

Final

Awards

Top scorers

See also
2019 AFC Champions League

References

External links
, the-AFC.com
AFC Cup 2019, stats.the-AFC.com

 
2019 in Asian football
2019